The discography of Scouting for Girls, a British pop rock band, consists of six studio albums, two extended plays and thirteen singles.

Albums

Studio albums

Compilation albums

Extended plays

Singles

Music videos

References

External links
 Discography section of Scouting for Girls website
 

Scouting for Girls